A. Jay Cristol (born September 25, 1929) is a judge, poet, author, pilot, and a lecturer of naval warfare. He served as a Special Assistant Attorney General of Florida from 1959 to 1965 and as a trustee in bankruptcy from 1977 to 1985.  He was appointed judge to the United States Bankruptcy Court for the Southern District of Florida on April 17, 1985, and served as the district's Chief Bankruptcy Judge from 1993 to 1999.

Cristol served as a U.S. Navy aviator and a captain in the U.S. Naval Reserve with 38 years of service in the diverse roles of both a carrier pilot and a Judge Advocate General Corps (JAG) lawyer.

Higher education
Cristol received his B.A. degree from the University of Miami in 1958 and his J.D. degree, cum laude, from the University of Miami School of Law in 1959, where he was research editor of the law review and recipient of other honors. (Cristol returned to the school in the late 1980s, and received his Ph.D from the Graduate School of International Studies at the University of Miami on May 9, 1997.)

Navy career

Cristol made his first flight in a Piper J-3 Cub on Biscayne Bay in 1945. He has personally piloted a Ford Tri-Motor, the Goodyear Blimp, a Soviet MiG-15, a Czech L-39, a Chinese CJ-6, a French Fouga Magister, and many other unique, antique, or historic aircraft.

In November 1951, during the Korean war, Cristol joined the US Navy. After receiving his wings in 1953, he deployed to the western Pacific and flew both day and night missions in the Grumman AF Guardian from the USS Princeton (CVS-37). Upon returning to the US, Cristol left active duty and joined the Naval Reserve.

He graduated from Naval Justice School and served as a naval JAG lawyer for another twenty years. In 1983, Cristol was appointed an honorary professor of the Naval Justice School. During the 1980s, he was sent to the International Institute of Humanitarian Law at Sanremo to lecture on the Law of Naval Warfare.

Research into USS Liberty incident
After completing law school, Cristol became a civil lawyer, and served as special assistant attorney general of Florida.  He also returned to school in pursuit of a doctoral degree.

While working on his Ph.D. thesis (from the late 1980s into the 1990s), Cristol analyzed the official investigations of the USS Liberty incident of June 8, 1967, in which Israeli forces attacked an American ship, resulting in a significant loss of life. Officially, the Liberty incident had already been investigated by more than a dozen government agencies and government-commissioned groups; it had always been reported to have been a tragic accident. Cristol conducted over 450 interviews. Freedom of Information Act requests were used to obtain declassification of the Clark Clifford Report, 22 hot-line messages, 22 National Security Agency documents, and 31 National Security Council documents. Cristol was also able to obtain classified Israeli documents. The conclusion of his dissertation confirmed the official investigations and demonstrated that the attack on the USS Liberty was a mistake.

Following completion of course work, Cristol continued to pursue information surrounding the event.  He sued the National Security Agency under the Freedom of Information Act. In 2004 the agency released audio tapes which had been collected by an NSA unit aboard a Navy Lockheed EC-121 Warning Star aircraft flying near the scene of the USS Liberty attack. Subsequently, Cristol published his analysis in 2002 as a book about the attack, The Liberty Incident: The 1967 Attack on the U.S. Navy Spy Ship. Cristol concluded that the tapes show the attack was an accident, and that the Israelis mistook the ship for an Egyptian warship.

Cristol's second book, The Liberty Incident Revealed: The Definitive Account of the 1967 Israeli Attack on the U.S. Navy Spy Ship, was published by the Naval Institute Press in 2013.

Civilian career
Cristol is currently an adjunct professor at the University of Miami School of Law where he teaches advanced bankruptcy courses He serves on the Bankruptcy Committee of the Eleventh Circuit and on the Judicial Conference Advisory Committee on Bankruptcy Rules. He has taught U.S. bankruptcy law to foreign judges from the Czech Republic, Slovenia, and Thailand. He also taught judges from Russia, India, Malaysia, Hong Kong, and South Africa, under various programs for the State Department, USAID, the American Bankruptcy Institute and the National Conference of Bankruptcy Judges. He has published numerous articles on law, aviation, history and other subjects.

O. J. Simpson and other notable rulings
Judge Cristol has presided over many high-profile bankruptcy cases and related proceedings. These include the Chapter 11 reorganization of General Development Corporation (one of the largest reorganizations in U.S. history), Prime Motor Inns, Flannigans, Banco Latino International, Arrow Air, and Pan American Airways.

In 2007, Judge Cristol awarded the rights of O. J. Simpson's book If I Did It to the family of Ronald Goldman to satisfy a $38 million wrongful death judgment against Simpson.

Personal 
Cristol remains an avid aviator. He is a founding member of the National Museum of Naval Aviation at the Naval Air Station in Pensacola, Florida and a founding member of the Wings Over Miami Military and Classic Aircraft Museum in Miami, Florida. Cristol is an Angel Flight volunteer pilot, flying people in need of transportation to and from regional medical centers for treatment. The 2007 May/June issue of Airliners magazine published a story about Judge Cristol; and Dow Jones featured Judge Cristol on January 2, 2008 in a three-page article.

Cristol was a Boy Scout, reportedly the first ever Eagle Scout in Dade County. He spends most of his free time volunteering with his wife at the Miami Jewish Home and Hospital. He was recently named as the head goodwill ambassador for the Miami Jewish Home and Hospital.

Awards and honors
A. Jay Cristol is an Eagle Scout of the Boy Scouts of America, earned on March 6, 1944. He was honored as a National Eagle Scout Association Outstanding Eagle Scout in South Florida Council in 2021.

During his navy service, Cristol received the Meritorious Service Medal, the Navy Commendation Medal, Navy Achievement Medal, China Service Medal, National Defense Medal, Navy and Marine Corps Overseas Service Medal, Naval Reserve Medal, and Vietnam Service Medal.

In 1998, Pan Am was sold to Guilford Transportation, in a transaction which removed Pan Am from bankruptcy. Consequently, the company honored Cristol, who presided over the speedy reorganization, by naming one of their 727-225 aircraft the Clipper A. Jay Cristol. After presiding over the reorganization of Arrow Air, he was honored by having an Arrow Air Douglas DC-8-62 named the "Judge A. Jay Cristol."<ref>Graham Hitchen. (Photo) [http://www.airliners.net/photo/Arrow-Air/McDonnell-Douglas-DC-8-62H(F)/0493541/L/&sid=d735ed4540658ee536620811295dc04b N8968U (cn 46069/465) The Judge A Jay Cristol' "]</ref>

Cristol is a founding member of the National Museum of Naval Aviation at the Naval Air Station in Pensacola, Florida and a founding member and historian of the Wings Over Miami aircraft museum in Miami.

In 2003, the Greater Miami Aviation Association honored Cristol with their Glenn Curtiss Award which recognizes the contributions of an individual to improve the South Florida community.

On February 1, 2007, St. Thomas University School of Law honored Cristol with its Outstanding Jurist Award.

 Judicial appointments 
 1957-1988 - United States Navy Lawyer
 1959-1963 - Office of the Attorney General, State of Florida. Special Assistant to the Attorney General of the State of Florida, 1959, 1961, 1963 and 1965 Legislative Sessions
 1959-1985 - Cristol, Mishan, Sloto.  Senior partner in commercial law firm
 1985–Present - United States Bankruptcy Court
 April 17, 1985 - Appointed Judge of the United States Bankruptcy Court for the Southern District of Florida
 October 1, 1993 – September 25, 1999 - Appointed Chief Judge of the United States Bankruptcy Court
 April 17, 1999 - Reappointed Judge for second 14-year term through 2013
 April 17, 2013 - Reappointed Judge for third 14-year term through 2027

 Academic assignments 
 1983 - Honorary Professor of Law, United States Naval Justice School. Lecturer of Law of Naval Warfare at the International Institute of Humanitarian Law, San Remo, Italy
 1988 to Present - Adjunct Professor of Law at University of Miami Law School
 1994 - Bankruptcy Law Instructor to Russian Judges for the National Conference of Bankruptcy Judges, Atlanta
 1995 - Bankruptcy Law Instructor to Judges from Hong Kong, Malaysia, India, Thailand and South Africa for the National Conference of Bankruptcy Judges, New Orleans
 1996 - Bankruptcy Law Instructor of Slovenian Judges for the Judicial Development Program sponsored by the u.S. Department of State, and American Bankruptcy Institute, Slovenia
 1996 - Bankruptcy Law Instructor to Czech Republic Judges for the Judicial Development Program sponsored by the U.S. Department of state, and American Bankruptcy Institute, Czech Republic

Publications
 "Theoretical Legal Problems in Converting the Central and Eastern European Military Industrial Complex to a Free Market Economy," 27 Foundation Notes, Naval War College (Spring 1996).
 The Liberty Incident (1997), Ph.D. dissertation, University of Miami.
 Bankruptcy Alchemy: Conversion of Nothing to Golden Opportunity. St. Thomas Law Review 9(1997):305. (with Ali Sarmiento Walden)
 The Liberty Incident: The 1967 Attack on the U.S. Navy Spy Ship. Washington (DC): Brassey's Military, 2002.  
 "The USS Liberty and the Role of Intelligence". Foreign Relations of the United States, 1964-1968, Vol. XIX, Dept. Of State (Washington D.C. 2004). Cristol, Castle and Hadden.
 The Liberty Incident Revealed: the Definitive Account of the 1967 Israeli Attack on the U.S. Navy Spy Ship''. Naval Institute Press, 2013.

References

External links
American College of Bankruptcy bio

1929 births
Living people
American aviators
Jewish American military personnel
American military historians
American male non-fiction writers
United States Navy personnel of the Korean War
American Korean War pilots
United States Navy personnel of the Vietnam War
United States Navy Judge Advocate General's Corps
Judges of the United States bankruptcy courts
Recipients of the Meritorious Service Decoration
University of Miami alumni
University of Miami School of Law alumni
University of Miami faculty
Historians from Florida
21st-century American Jews